Hindsiclava macilenta is a species of sea snail, a marine gastropod mollusc in the family Pseudomelatomidae, the turrids and allies.

Description
The length of the shell varies between 35 mm and 43 mm.

(Original description) In comparison with Hindsiclava alesidota, the shell is more slender, the sculpture more elegant, the spiral element proportionally stronger, existing on the fasciole and siphonal canal, as well as over the rest of the surface. This is a very plain, simple looking species of a dull color.

Distribution
This marine species occurs from North Carolina to West Florida, USA; and off Barbados and Guadeloupe. Early Pliocene fossils have been found in Venezuela.

References

 B. Landau and C. Marques da Silva. 2010. Early Pliocene gastropods of Cubagua, Venezuela: Taxonomy, palaeobiogeography and ecostratigraphy. Palaeontos 19:1–221

External links
 Rosenberg G., Moretzsohn F. & García E. F. (2009). Gastropoda (Mollusca) of the Gulf of Mexico, Pp. 579–699 in Felder, D.L. and D.K. Camp (eds.), Gulf of Mexico–Origins, Waters, and Biota. Biodiversity. Texas A&M Press, College Station, Texas
 
 

macilenta
Gastropods described in 1889